Fabiana "Fabi" Alvim de Oliveira (born 7 March 1980 in Rio de Janeiro) is a retired volleyball player from Brazil who won the gold medal at the 2008 and 2012 Summer Olympics.

Career
Fabiana started playing volleyball at the age of 13, specializing in defense - and later the libero position - due to her short height. De Oliveira was first called up to the Brazil women's national volleyball team in 2002, under coach Marco Aurélio Motta. She lost her place under his replacement, José Roberto Guimarães, and only returned to being a mainstay of the team in 2005. At the 2007 Pan American Games, held in Rio de Janeiro, de Oliveira and the Brazilian team won the silver medal.

One year later de Oliveira won the gold medal at the 2008 Summer Olympics, and was chosen as the best libero of the tournament.

At the 2011 Pan-American Cup, de Oliveira was given the "Best Receiver" award, also winning the gold medal with her national team.

Oliveira was part of the national team who won the gold medal at the 2011 Pan American Games held in Guadalajara, Mexico. She was also part of the Brazilian team that won the gold medal at the 2012 Summer Olympics. She also took the 2013 South American Championship with her national team, winning the Best Libero award.

Oliveira won the silver medal at the 2013 Club World Championship, playing with Unilever Vôlei.

During the 2015 FIVB Club World Championship, Oliveira played with the Brazilian club Rexona Ades Rio and her team lost the bronze medal match to the Swiss Voléro Zürich.

Oliveira decided to retire from volleyball after the 2017/2018 season of the Brazilian Superliga, when her team Sesc Rio won the silver medal. Currently Oliveira is working as a volleyball commentator.

Awards

Individuals
 2002 FIVB World Grand Prix – "Best Libero"
 2008 Final Four Cup – "Best Libero"
 2008 Final Four Cup – "Best Receiver"
 2008 Summer Olympics – "Best Libero"
 2009 South American Club Championship – "Best Libero"
 2009 Montreux Volley Masters – "Best Libero"
 2009 South American Championship – "Most Valuable Player"
 2009 South American Championship – "Best Receiver"
 2011 Pan-American Cup – "Best Receiver"
 2011 FIVB World Grand Prix – "Best Digger"
 2011 South American Championship – "Best Libero"
 2011 FIVB World Cup – "Best Receiver"
 2013 South American Club Championship – "Best Libero"
 2013 South American Championship – "Best Libero"
 2013 FIVB World Grand Prix – "Best Libero"
 2015 South American Club Championship – "Best Libero"
 2016 South American Club Championship – "Best Libero"
 2016 FIVB Club World Championship – "Best Libero"
 2017 South American Club Championship – "Best Libero"

Clubs
 2013 FIVB Club World Championship –  Runner-up, with Unilever Vôlei
 2017 FIVB Club World Championship –  Runner-up, with Rexona/SESC
 2013 Club South American Championship –  Champion, with Unilever Vôlei
 2015 Club South American Championship –  Champion, with Rexona/Ades
 2016 Club South American Championship –  Champion, with Rexona/Ades
 2017 South American Club Championship –  Champion, with Rexona/SESC
 2018 South American Club Championship –  Runner-up, with SESC Rio

References

External links
Athlete bio at 2008 Olympics website

1980 births
Living people
Volleyball players from Rio de Janeiro (city)
Brazilian women's volleyball players
Volleyball players at the 2008 Summer Olympics
Olympic volleyball players of Brazil
Olympic gold medalists for Brazil
Volleyball players at the 2007 Pan American Games
Volleyball players at the 2011 Pan American Games
Olympic medalists in volleyball
Volleyball players at the 2012 Summer Olympics
Medalists at the 2012 Summer Olympics
Medalists at the 2008 Summer Olympics
Pan American Games gold medalists for Brazil
Pan American Games silver medalists for Brazil
Pan American Games medalists in volleyball
Liberos
Medalists at the 2007 Pan American Games
Medalists at the 2011 Pan American Games